The Orchestral Trios, Op. 1 was the first publication of a work by Johann Stamitz and one of the two prints issued during his lifetime.  It was a famous and influential set of six orchestral trios.  Most likely its composition dates from the 1750s.

External links

Compositions for chamber orchestra
Compositions by Johann Stamitz